This article lists the colonial governors of Nauru, from the establishment of the German colonial presence in 1888 (as part of German New Guinea), through the Japanese occupation during World War II, until the independence of the Australian-administered Trust Territory of Nauru in 1968.

List

(Dates in italics indicate de facto continuation of office)

On 30 January 1968, Nauru achieved independence.  For a list of heads of state after independence, see President of Nauru.

See also
Nauru
Politics of Nauru
President of Nauru
Lists of office-holders
Australia–Nauru relations
Phosphate mining in Banaba and Nauru

External links
World Statesmen.org: Nauru

History of Nauru

Nauru-related lists
Nauru
Foreign relations of Nauru
Australia–Nauru relations
Nauru–New Zealand relations
Nauru–United Kingdom relations
19th century in Nauru
20th century in Nauru